Jeremy Aldrich  is a retired American soccer defender who spent two seasons in Major League Soccer.

Player

Youth
Aldrich attended the Butler University where he played on the men's soccer team from 1995 to 1998.  He was a 1998 Second Team All American.  Butler inducted him into the school's Athletic Hall of Fame in 2011.  Aldrich played for the Kalamazoo Kingdom during the 1996 collegiate offseason and the Michigan Bucks during the 1998 offseason.

Professional
On February 6, 1999, the Miami Fusion drafted Aldrich in the second round (nineteenth overall) of the 1999 MLS College Draft.  He played eighteen games as a rookie, but saw his playing time diminish in 2000 due to several injuries, particularly in the knee and back area.  That season, the Fusion sent Aldrich on loan to MLS Pro-40 in the USL A-League for three games.  The Fusion released him in February 2001.  In March 2001, the Indiana Blast of the USL A-League signed Aldrich.  He went on loan to the Chicago Fire and Columbus Crew during the season, but never entered a game with either team.  In 2002, he moved to the Milwaukee Rampage and Milwaukee Wave United for the 2003 season.  He also played the last game of the indoor season for the Milwaukee Wave of the Major Indoor Soccer League.  He moved to the Philadelphia KiXX in the fall of 2003.  He spent two seasons with the KiXX.  In 2004, he also played for the Virginia Beach Mariners.  In 2005, Aldrich signed with the Colorado Rapids.  He played one game for the Rapids’ reserve team, but never entered a first team game.

International
In 1996 and 1997, Aldrich played for the United States men's national under-20 soccer team.

Coach
In 2001, Aldrich spent one season as an assistant coach with the Butler Bulldogs.  In August 2008, he became an assistant coach with the Metro State College men's soccer team.

References

External links 
 CNNSI: Jeremy Aldrich

1977 births
Living people
Sportspeople from Kalamazoo, Michigan
American soccer players
American soccer coaches
Association football defenders
Butler Bulldogs men's soccer players
Indiana Blast players
Kalamazoo Kingdom players
Major League Soccer players
Major Indoor Soccer League (2001–2008) players
Miami Fusion players
Flint City Bucks players
Milwaukee Rampage players
Milwaukee Wave players
Milwaukee Wave United players
Philadelphia KiXX players
A-League (1995–2004) players
Virginia Beach Mariners players
USL League Two players
MLS Pro-40 players
Chicago Fire FC players
Columbus Crew players
Colorado Rapids players
Soccer players from Michigan
United States men's under-20 international soccer players
Miami Fusion draft picks
Butler Bulldogs men's soccer coaches